Where the Crawdads Sing is a 2018 coming-of-age murder mystery novel by American zoologist Delia Owens. The story follows two timelines that slowly intertwine. The first timeline describes the life and adventures of a young girl named Kya as she grows up isolated in the marshes of North Carolina. The second timeline follows an investigation into the apparent murder of Chase Andrews, a local celebrity of Barkley Cove, in a fictional coastal town of North Carolina.

By July 2022, the book had sold over 15 million copies. A film adaptation was released in July 2022.

Plot

Part I – The Marsh

In 1952, six-year-old Catherine Danielle Clark (nicknamed "Kya") watches her mother abandon her and her family due to violent abuse from her husband, Kya's father. While Kya waits in vain for her mother's return, she witnesses her older siblings, Missy, Murph, Mandy, and Jodie, all leave as well, due to their father's drinking and physical abuse.

Alone with her father—who temporarily stops drinking—Kya learns to fish. Her father gives her his knapsack to hold her collections of shells and feathers. The illiterate Kya paints these shells and feathers, as well as the marsh's creatures and shorelines, with watercolors her mother left behind.

One day, Kya finds a letter in the mailbox. Her father snatches the letter from her hands as she ran from the mailbox squealing with delight that they had finally received a letter from her mother. After reading the letter he becomes infuriated and burns the letter along with most of her mother's wardrobe and canvases. He returns to drinking and takes long, frequent trips away to gamble. Eventually, he does not return at all, and Kya assumes he is dead, making him the last of the family to leave her alone in the marsh. Without money and family, she survives by gardening and trading fresh mussels and smoked fish for money and gas from Jumpin', a Black man who owns a gasoline station at the boat dock. Jumpin' and his wife Mabel become lifelong friends to Kya, and Mabel collects donated clothing for her.

As Kya grows up, she faces prejudice from the townspeople of Barkley Cove, North Carolina, who nickname her "The Marsh Girl". She is laughed at by the schoolchildren the only day she goes to school and is called "nasty" and "filthy" by the pastor's wife. However, she becomes friendly with Tate Walker, an old friend of Jodie's who sometimes fishes in the marsh. When Kya loses her bearings one day, Tate leads her home in his boat. Years later, he leaves her feathers from rare birds, then teaches her how to read and write. The two form a romantic relationship until Tate leaves for college at the University of North Carolina at Chapel Hill. He promises to return, yet later realizes Kya cannot live in his more civilized world because of how wild and independent she is, and leaves her without saying goodbye.

Part II – The Swamp

In 1965, Kya is 19. Chase Andrews, Barkley Cove's star quarterback and playboy, invites her to a picnic, during which he tries to have sex with her. He later apologizes, and the two form a romantic relationship. He shows her an abandoned fire tower, and she gives him a necklace of a shell he found during their picnic, strung on a rawhide string. Despite her suspicions, she believes Chase's promises of marriage and consummates their relationship in a cheap motel room in Asheville, North Carolina. She’s leaving the grocery store one day and runs into Chase and his fiancée and realizes his promises of marriage were a ruse for sex. She then ends their relationship.

Tate, having graduated from college, visits Kya and attempts to apologize for having left her and confesses his love for her. Still hurt from his betrayal, she rejects him. Despite this, she allows him inside her shack, and he is impressed by her expanded collection of seashells. He urges her to publish a reference book on seashells, and she does so as well as on seabirds. With the extra money, she renovates her home. The same year, Jodie, now in the Army, also returns to Kya's life, expressing regret he left her alone and breaking the news their mother had suffered from mental illness and died of leukemia two years previously. Kya forgives her mother for leaving but still cannot understand why she never returned. After advising Kya to give Tate a second chance, Jodie sets off for Georgia, leaving Kya a note with his phone number and address.

Some time later, while relaxing in a cove, Kya is confronted by Chase. After an argument ensues, Chase attacks Kya, beating her and attempting to rape her. She fends him off and loudly threatens to kill him if he doesn't leave her alone. The encounter is witnessed by two fishermen nearby. Back at her shack, Kya fears that reporting the assault would be futile as the town would blame her for "being loose". The next week, she witnesses Chase boating up to her shack and hides until he leaves. Remembering her father's abuse, Kya fears retaliation from Chase, knowing "these men had to have the last punch".

Kya is offered a chance to meet her publisher in Greenville, North Carolina, and takes the bus there to meet him. After she returns home the next day, some boys find Chase dead beneath the fire tower. The sheriff, Ed Jackson, believes it to be a murder on the basis of there being no tracks or fingerprints, including Chase's, around the tower. Ed speaks with sources and receives conflicting statements. He learns the shell necklace Kya gave to Chase was missing when his body was found, even though he wore it the night he died. Kya was seen leaving Barkley Cove before the murder, then returning the day after Chase died. There also were red wool fibers on Chase's jacket that belonged to a hat Tate had given to Kya. Convinced she is the culprit responsible for Chase's murder, Ed arrests Kya near Jumpin's wharf, charges her with first-degree murder, and jails her without bail for two months.

At Kya's trial in 1970, only contradictory and circumstantial evidence is provided. Kya's lawyer, Tom Milton, debunks the prosecutor's arguments as there was no evidence that Kya was at the fire tower on the night of Chase's death. The jury finds her not guilty. She returns home and reconciles with Tate. They live together in her shack until she dies peacefully in her boat at the age of 64. Later, while searching for Kya's will and other documents, Tate finds a hidden box with some of her old possessions and realizes that Kya had written poems under the name of Amanda Hamilton, the poet frequently quoted throughout the book. He also finds a poem that virtually describes the murder of Chase, obviously written from the murderer's point of view. He then finds, underneath the poems, the shell necklace Chase wore until the night he died. There is a clear implication that Kya had killed Chase. Tate then burns the rawhide string and drops the shell onto the beach, choosing to hide Kya's secret forever to ensure her legacy remains untainted.

Ethology 

Ethology, the study of animal behavior, is a topic that is covered in the book. Kya reads about ethology, including an article titled "Sneaky Fuckers", where she learns about female fireflies, who use their coded flashing light signal to lure a male of another species to his death, and about female mantises who lure a male mate and start eating the mate's head and thorax while his abdomen is still copulating with her.

Meaning of title 

Crawdad is an American slang word for crayfish: these crustaceans cannot sing, but when Kya's mother encouraged her to explore the marsh, she would often say: "Go as far as you can -– way out yonder where the crawdads sing." When Tate also used the phrase, she asked him the meaning and he replied: "Just means far in the bush where critters are wild, still behaving like critters." Delia Owens was inspired to use the phrase because her own mother had used it when she was a child.

Reception

The book was selected for Reese Witherspoon's Hello Sunshine Book Club in September 2018 and for Barnes & Noble's Best Books of 2018.

By December 2019, the book had sold over 4.5 million copies, and it sold more print copies in 2019 than any other adult title, fiction or non-fiction. It was also No. 1 for 2019 on Amazon.com's list of Most Sold Books in fiction. It topped The New York Times Fiction Best Sellers of 2019 and The New York Times Fiction Best Sellers of 2020.

In late December 2020, The New York Times listed it as the #6 hardcover bestseller that year. In 2022, Publishers Weekly ranked it the 14th bestselling book of 2021, with sales of 625,599 copies, and as of late February 2022, the book had spent 150 weeks on the best seller list. In April 2022, it was reported that the book had sold 12 million copies. By July 2022, the book had sold over 15 million copies, making it one of the best-selling books of all time.

Since "crawdad" is a regional term, it sparked a rise in online queries about the word's meaning.

Aspects of Kya's life and the novel's narrative choices, including its attitude towards its Black characters, are said to be reminiscent of Owens' time in Zambia, where she, her then husband, and his son are still wanted for questioning in the killing of a poacher captured on film in a 1996 report by ABC News. Owens is not a suspect, but is considered a potential witness.

Film adaptation 

Sony Pictures Releasing bought the film rights to the book, and Reese Witherspoon's Hello Sunshine production company produced, with Witherspoon and Lauren Neustadter co-producing. Lucy Alibar adapted the book to film script. Daisy Edgar-Jones plays Kya, with Taylor John Smith and Harris Dickinson as Tate Walker and Chase Andrews, respectively. Filming took place from mid-April through mid/late-June 2021 in and around New Orleans and Houma, Louisiana. On July 5, 2021, Cosmopolitan reported that filming had wrapped. The film was released on July 15, 2022.

The soundtrack album is by Canadian composer Mychael Danna. Taylor Swift also contributed an original song, "Carolina", to the soundtrack.

References

Further reading 

 

Novels set in North Carolina
2018 American novels
2018 debut novels
G. P. Putnam's Sons books
Novels about alcoholism
Environmental fiction books
American crime novels